Kei'a (previously Te-apunavai) is one of the six traditional districts of the island of Mangaia in the Cook Islands. It is located on the west side of the island, to the south of the District of Tava'enga and west of Veitatei. The district was traditionally divided into 6 tapere:
 Akaoro
 Tapuata
 Tongamarama
 Te-inati
 Rupetau-i-miri
 Rupetau-i-uta

The major habitation is the village of Oneroa, which is home to over half of the island's population. The Auraka cave is also in this district.

References 

Districts of the Cook Islands
Mangaia